Hyopsodontidae is an extinct family of primitive mammals from the order Condylarthra, living from the Paleocene to the Eocene in North America and Eurasia. Condylarthra is now thought to be a wastebasket taxon; hyopsodontids have occasionally been speculated to be related to Afrotheria, but the most recent consensus is that they are related to Perissodactyla. Analysis of the inner ear shows shared characteristics with the Equoidea (horses and paleotheres); they may be a basal ungulate group near to perissodactyls.

They were generally small omnivores, like many early mammals. The most common genus is Hyopsodus. 

Members of the family were small by modern standards, ranging in size from a small rat to a raccoon. The hyopsodontids had many primitive mammal characteristics, including five-toed feet with claws and a complete dentition: a full set of incisors, canines, premolars, and molars. During the Paleocene in Europe, they reached a high diversity level, starting with Louisina and Monshyus in Hainin, Belgium, and following in the Cernaysian beds with Tricuspiodon, Paratricuspiodon, and Paschatherium. High levels of diversity are also seen in Western North America in the Eocene within the genus Hyopsodus, with up to 18 named species, some of which are specific to particular locations over short spans of geologic time. This pattern suggests that at least some hyosodontids became quite specialized for specific ways of life. The group was not especially long-lived, but highly successful for its time, with fossil material in some areas suggesting large numbers of individuals.

List of genera
 Aletodon
 Dorraletes
 Haplaletes
 Haplomylus
 Hyopsodus
 Litomylus
 Paratricuspiodon
 Paschatherium
 Phenacodaptes
 Tricuspiodon

References

Prehistoric mammal families
Paleocene mammals
Danian first appearances
Eocene extinctions
Condylarths
Taxa named by Édouard Louis Trouessart